Shahrak-e Qarah Lar (also Romanized as Shahraḵ-e Qarah Lar) is a village in Garmkhan Rural District, Garmkhan District, Bojnord County, North Khorasan Province, Iran. At the 2006 census, its population was 549, in 119 families.

References 

Populated places in Bojnord County